Julie A. Buckler is an American literary scholar and Samuel Hazzard Cross Professor of Slavic Languages and Literatures and of Comparative Literature at Harvard University. She is known for her expertise on comparative literature.

Books
 Russian Performances: Word, Object, Action. Co-edited with Julie Cassiday and Boris Wolfson, University of Wisconsin Press 2018
 Mapping St. Petersburg: Imperial Text and Cityshape, Princeton University Press, 2005
 The Literary Lorgnette: Attending Opera in Imperial Russia. Stanford University Press, 2000
 Rites of Place: Public Commemoration in Russia and Eastern Europe, Julie A. Buckler and Emily D. Johnson, eds. Northwestern University Press, 2012

References

External links
Julie A. Buckler

Living people
American literary critics
Comparative literature academics
Year of birth missing (living people)
American women academics
Harvard University alumni
Harvard University faculty
Yale University alumni